Ángel Herrero Herrero (born 19 September 1949) is a Spanish former footballer who played as a midfielder.

Football career
Born in Villabrágima, Province of Valladolid, Herrero started his senior career with Sestao Sport Club in Tercera División. In the 1971 summer he signed for Cádiz CF from Segunda División, going on to spend four seasons in the category.

Herrero retired as a professional in 1977, aged only 27.

References

External links
 
 Stats at Cadistas1910 

1949 births
Living people
Sportspeople from the Province of Valladolid
Spanish footballers
Footballers from Castile and León
Association football midfielders
Segunda División players
Tercera División players
Sestao Sport Club footballers
Cádiz CF players